Gora Severny or Gora Severnyy Nunatak is a nunatak in Novaya Zemlya. It is one of the very few nunataks of the Russian Federation. Administratively it falls under the Arkhangelsk Oblast.

Geography
Gora Severny Nunatak is located in the northern section of Severny Island ice cap, the long ice cap covering most of inner Severny Island, Novaya Zemlya. It is not far from the western coast of the island. 

The nunatak is 4.9 km in length and its maximum width is 2.4 km.

See also
List of Nunataks

References

Mountains of Arkhangelsk Oblast
Nunataks
Novaya Zemlya